Phytolacca heterotepala, the Mexican pokeweed, is a species of plant in the pokeweed family Phytolaccaceae. It is native to the Tamaulipas State of northeast Mexico and has been introduced to the U.S. state of California and Portugal.

References

Flora of Mexico
heterotepala
Plants described in 1909